The Symphony Sessions may refer to:

 The Symphony Sessions (Red Rider album), 1989 
 The Symphony Sessions (The Manhattan Transfer album), 2006